The Football NSW 2014 season was the second season under the new competition format for state-level football (soccer) in New South Wales.  The competition consisted of four divisions across the State of New South Wales. The overall premier for the new structure qualified for the National Premier Leagues finals series, competing with the other state federation champions in a final knockout tournament to decide the National Premier Leagues Champion for 2014.

League Tables

2014 National Premier League NSW Men's 1

The National Premier League New South Wales 2014 season was played over 22 rounds, from March to August 2014.

Results

Finals

2014 National Premier League NSW Men's 2

The 2014 National Premier League NSW Men's 2 was the second edition of the new NPL NSW 2 as the second level domestic association football competition in New South Wales. 12 teams competed, all playing each other twice for a total of 22 rounds, with the top team at the end of the year being promoted to the NPL NSW Men's 1 competition.

Finals

2014 NSW State League Division 1

The 2014 NSW State League Division 1 was the second edition of the State League to be incorporated under the National Premier Leagues banner. 12 teams competed, all playing each other twice for a total of 22 rounds.

NBThe final round match between Northbridge FC and Inter Lions was not played, as it had been postponed and had no effect on the finals series.

Finals

2014 NSW State League Division 2

The 2014 NSW State League Division 2 was the second edition of the State League to be incorporated under the National Premier Leagues banner. 9 teams competed, all playing each other twice for a total of 16 matches.

Finals

2014 National Premier League NSW Women's 1

The 2014 National Premier League NSW Women's 1 was the first edition of the new NPL NSW Women's competition to be incorporated under the National Premier Leagues banner. 9 teams competed, all playing each other three times for a total of 27 rounds.

Finals

2014 Waratah Cup

Football NSW soccer clubs competed in 2014 for the Waratah Cup. The tournament doubled as the NSW qualifier for the 2014 FFA Cup, with the top seven clubs progressing to the Round of 32. 100 clubs entered the qualifying phase, with the clubs entering in a staggered format (with NPL and NPL 2 clubs seeded to a later round). The four quarter-final winners were randomly drawn  to create the semi-final fixtures of the competition.

The competition was won by Blacktown City, their 4th title, defeating Manly United by six goals to two.

In addition to the three A-League clubs (Central Coast Mariners, Sydney FC and Western Sydney Wanderers), seven qualifiers (Blacktown City, Hakoah Sydney City East, Manly United, Parramatta FC, Sydney Olympic, Sydney United 58 and South Coast Wolves) competed in the final rounds of the 2014 FFA Cup. Of these qualifying clubs, only Sydney Olympic and Sydney United 58 progressed to the Round of 16.

Awards 
The end of year awards were presented at Rosehill Gardens on 12 September 2014.

National Premier Leagues NSW

National Premier Leagues NSW 2

References

2014 in Australian soccer